This is a list of National Hockey League (NHL) players who have played at least one game in the NHL from 1917 to present and have a last name that starts with "H".

List updated as of the 2018–19 NHL season.

Haa–Ham

 Kari Haakana
 Ari Haanpaa
 Henrik Haapala
 David Haas
 Gaetan Haas
 Marc Habscheid
 Len Hachborn
 Jeff Hackett
 Matt Hackett
 Lloyd Haddon
 Vic Hadfield
 Brandon Hagel
 Carl Hagelin
 Robert Hagg
 James Haggarty 
 Sean Haggerty
 Roger Hagglund
 Matti Hagman
 Niklas Hagman
 Nicolas Hague
 Riku Hahl
 Gordon Haidy
 Ron Hainsey
 George Hainsworth
 Richard Hajdu
 Libor Hajek
 Bill Hajt
 Chris Hajt
 Jani Hakanpaa
 Anders Hakansson
 Jaroslav Halak
 Haldor Halderson
 David Hale
 Larry Hale
 Len Haley
 Micheal Haley
 Matt Halischuk
 Bob Halkidis
 Steven Halko
 Adam Hall
 Bob Hall
 Del Hall
 Glenn Hall
 Joe Hall
 Murray Hall
 Taylor Hall (born 1964)
 Taylor Hall (born 1991)
 Wayne Hall
 Kevin Haller
 Milt Halliday
 Mats Hallin
 Mike Halmo
 Jeff Halpern
 Brandon Halverson
 Trevor Halverson
 Doug Halward
 Denis Hamel
 Gilles Hamel
 Herbert Hamel
 Jean Hamel
 Pierre Hamel
 Dan Hamhuis
 Red Hamill
 Zach Hamill
 Al Hamilton
 Chuck Hamilton
 Curtis Hamilton
 Dougie Hamilton
 Freddie Hamilton
 Jackie Hamilton
 Jeff Hamilton
 Jim Hamilton
 Reg Hamilton
 Ryan Hamilton
 Inge Hammarstrom
 Ken Hammond
 Andrew Hammond
 Travis Hamonic
 Gord Hampson
 Ted Hampson
 Rick Hampton
 Radek Hamr
 Roman Hamrlik
 Mark Hamway

Han–Haz

 Fredrik Handemark
 Ron Handy
 Michal Handzus
 Alan Hangsleben
 Noah Hanifin
 Ben Hankinson
 Casey Hankinson
 Joel Hanley
 Glen Hanlon
 John Hanna
 Dave Hannan
 Scott Hannan
 Gord Hannigan
 Pat Hannigan
 Ray Hannigan
 Markus Hannikainen
 Ben Hanowski
 Jannik Hansen
 Richie Hansen
 Tavis Hansen
 Christian Hanson
 Dave Hanson
 Emil Hanson
 Keith Hanson
 Oscar Hanson
 Martin Hanzal
 Nick Harbaruk
 Jeff Harding
 Josh Harding
 Jocelyn Hardy
 Mark Hardy
 Jim Hargreaves
 Johan Harju 
 Brett Harkins
 Jansen Harkins
 Todd Harkins
 David Harlock
 Scott Harlow
 Glen Harmon
 Johnny Harms
 Walter Harnott
 Shane Harper
 Terry Harper
 Ben Harpur
 Tim Harrer
 Hago Harrington
 Scott Harrington
 Billy Harris (born 1935)
 Billy Harris (born 1952)
 Duke Harris
 Henry Harris
 Hugh Harris
 Ron Harris
 Ted Harris
 Smokey Harris
 Ed Harrison
 Jay Harrison
 Jim Harrison
 Paul Harrison
 Peter Harrold
 Carter Hart
 Gerry Hart
 Harold "Gizzy" Hart
 Mark Hartigan
 Teemu Hartikainen
 Mike Hartman
 Ryan Hartman
 Scott Hartnell
 Craig Hartsburg
 Doug Harvey
 Buster Harvey
 Hugh Harvey
 Todd Harvey
 Dominik Hasek
 Bob Hassard
 Derian Hatcher
 Kevin Hatcher
 Garnet Hathaway
 Ed Hatoum
 Brett Hauer
 Erik Haula
 Adam Hauser
 Niclas Havelid
 Martin Havlat
 Dale Hawerchuk
 Greg Hawgood
 Todd Hawkins
 Alan Haworth
 Gordie Haworth
 Neil Hawryliw
 Jayce Hawryluk
 Bill Hay
 Dwayne Hay
 George Hay
 Jim Hay
 Darren Haydar
 John Hayden
 Peter Hayek
 Chris Hayes
 Eriah Hayes
 Jimmy Hayes
 Kevin Hayes
 Paul Haynes
 Barrett Hayton
 Brian Hayward
 Rick Hayward
 Steve Hazlett

He

 Don Head
 Galen Head
 Fern Headley
 Eric Healey
 Rich Healey
 Glenn Healy
 Shawn Heaphy
 Mark Heaslip
 Randy Heath
 Dillon Heatherington
 Dany Heatley
 Andy Hebenton
 Guy Hebert
 Sammy Hebert
 Jochen Hecht
 Radoslav Hecl
 Anders Hedberg
 Johan Hedberg
 Bret Hedican
 Pierre Hedin
 Victor Hedman
 Jonathan Hedstrom
 Tim Heed
 Jeff Heerema
 Cal Heeter
 Frank Heffernan
 Gerald Heffernan
 Mike Heidt
 Ilkka Heikkinen
 Bill Heindl Jr.
 Danton Heinen
 Ville Heinola
 Lionel Heinrich
 Shawn Heins
 Rick Heinz
 Steve Heinze
 Earl Heiskala
 Miro Heiskanen
 Barrett Heisten
 Jan Hejda
 Milan Hejduk
 Peter Helander
 Timo Helbling
 Riku Helenius
 Sami Helenius
 Seth Helgeson
 Magnus Hellberg
 Connor Hellebuyck
 Ehrhardt Heller
 Darren Helm
 Harry Helman
 Bryan Helmer
 Dwight Helminen
 Raimo Helminen
 Colin Hemingway
 Tony Hemmerling
 Ales Hemsky
 Archie Henderson
 Jay Henderson 
 John Henderson
 Kevin Henderson
 Matt Henderson
 Murray Henderson
 Paul Henderson
 Matt Hendricks
 Darby Hendrickson
 Jack Hendrickson
 Jordan Hendry
 Samuel Henley
 Josh Hennessy
 Lorne Henning
 Adam Henrique
 Alex Henry
 Burke Henry
 Camille Henry
 Dale Henry
 Gordon Henry
 Jim Henry
 T. J. Hensick
 Jukka Hentunen
 Aleksi Heponiemi
 Alan Hepple
 Ian Herbers
 Jimmy Herbert
 Art Herchenratter
 Fred Hergerts
 Phil Hergesheimer
 Wally Hergesheimer
 Red Heron
 Yves Heroux
 Chris Herperger
 Matt Herr
 Denis Herron
 Jason Herter
 Tomas Hertl
 Matt Hervey
 Shaun Heshka
 Bob Hess
 Jamie Heward
 Obs Heximer
 Bryan Hextall 
 Bryan Hextall Jr.
 Dennis Hextall
 Ron Hextall
 Vic Heyliger

Hi–Hn

 Bill Hicke
 Ernie Hicke
 Joe Hicketts
 Greg Hickey
 Pat Hickey
 Thomas Hickey
 Alex Hicks
 Doug Hicks
 Glenn Hicks
 Hal Hicks
 Wayne Hicks
 Andre Hidi
 Uli Hiemer
 Chris Higgins
 Matt Higgins
 Paul Higgins
 Tim Higgins
 Matthew Highmore
 Hec Highton
 Andy Hilbert
 Ike Hildebrand
 Adin Hill
 Al Hill
 Brian Hill
 Mel Hill
 Sean Hill
 Jack Hillen
 Jim Hiller
 Jonas Hiller
 Wilbert Hiller 
 Randy Hillier
 Blake Hillman
 Floyd Hillman
 Larry Hillman
 Wayne Hillman
 John Hilworth
 Norman Himes 
 Dave Hindmarch
 Vinnie Hinostroza
 Dan Hinote
 Andre Hinse
 Dan Hinton
 Roope Hintz
 Taro Hirose
 Corey Hirsch
 Tom Hirsch
 Bert Hirschfeld
 Nico Hischier
 Joey Hishon
 Jamie Hislop
 Lionel Hitchman
 Niklas Hjalmarsson
 Jan Hlavac
 Ivan Hlinka
 Jaroslav Hlinka
 Todd Hlushko
 Shane Hnidy
 Milan Hnilicka

Hoc–Hol

 Joshua Ho-Sang
 Justin Hocking
 Charlie Hodge
 Ken Hodge
 Ken Hodge, Jr.
 Justin Hodgman
 Cody Hodgson
 Dan Hodgson
 Rick Hodgson
 Ted Hodgson
 Kevin Hodson
 Cecil Hoekstra
 Ed Hoekstra
 Phil Hoene
 Vic Hoffinger
 Mike Hoffman (born 1963)
 Mike Hoffman (born 1989)
 Bob Hoffmeyer 
 Jim Hofford
 Bruce Hoffort
 Bill Hogaboam
 Dale Hoganson
 Paul Hoganson
 Marcus Hogberg
 Jeff Hoggan
 Nils Hoglander
 Jonas Hoglund
 Goran Hogosta
 Benoit Hogue
 Milos Holan
 Terry Holbrook
 Josh Holden
 Mark Holden
 Nick Holden 
 Bobby Holik
 Justin Holl
 Jason Holland
 Jerry Holland
 Ken Holland
 Patrick Holland
 Peter Holland
 Robert Holland
 Flash Hollett
 Terry Hollinger
 Bucky Hollingworth
 Bruce Holloway
 George "Bud" Holloway
 Ryan Hollweg
 Philip Holm
 Bill Holmes
 Charlie Holmes
 Hap Holmes
 Louis Holmes
 Warren Holmes
 Paul Holmgren
 Johan Holmqvist
 Michael Holmqvist
 Ben Holmstrom
 Tomas Holmstrom
 Jonas Holos
 Johnny Holota
 Greg Holst
 Chris Holt
 Gary Holt
 Randy Holt
 Braden Holtby
 Albert Holway
 Korbinian Holzer
 Brian Holzinger

Hom–Hoy

 Ron Homenuke
 Julius Honka
 Ron Hoover
 Dean Hopkins
 Larry Hopkins
 Tony Horacek
 Miloslav Horava
 Doug Horbul
 Shawn Horcoff
 Darcy Hordichuk 
 Mike Hordy
 Pete Horeck
 George Horne
 Red Horner
 Patric Hornqvist
 Larry Hornung
 Nathan Horton
 Tim Horton
 Bo Horvat
 Bronco Horvath
 Ed Hospodar
 Marcel Hossa
 Marian Hossa
 Martin Hostak
 Greg Hotham 
 Paul Houck
 Doug Houda
 Claude Houde
 Eric Houde
 Mike Hough
 Bill Houlder
 Martin Houle
 Rejean Houle
 Phil Housley
 Ken Houston
 Jack Howard
 Jimmy Howard
 Garry Howatt
 Brett Howden
 Quinton Howden
 Gordie Howe
 Mark Howe
 Marty Howe
 Syd Howe
 Vic Howe
 Harry Howell
 Ron Howell
 Don Howse
 Scott Howson
 Dave Hoyda

Hr–Hy

 Raman Hrabarenka
 Jan Hrdina
 Jiri Hrdina
 Dave Hrechkosy
 Marek Hrivik
 Jim Hrivnak
 Tony Hrkac
 Filip Hronek
 Kelly Hrudey
 Jim Hrycuik
 Steve Hrymnak
 Tim Hrynewich
 Bill Huard
 Rolly Huard
 Petr Hubacek
 Willie Huber
 Jonathan Huberdeau
 Greg Hubick
 Fran Huck
 Fred Hucul
 Charlie Huddy
 Jiri Hudler
 Charles Hudon
 Dave Hudson
 Lex Hudson
 Mike Hudson
 Ron Hudson
 Cristobal Huet
 Kerry Huffman 
 Al Huggins
 Albert Hughes
 Brent Hughes (born 1943)
 Brent Hughes (born 1966)
 Cameron Hughes
 Frank Hughes
 Howie Hughes
 Jack Hughes (born 1957)
 Jack Hughes (born 2001)
 James Hughes
 John Hughes
 Pat Hughes
 Quinn Hughes
 Ryan Hughes
 Joe Hulbig
 Bobby Hull
 Brett Hull
 Dennis Hull
 Jody Hull
 Cale Hulse
 Brad Hunt
 Dryden Hunt
 Fred Hunt 
 Jamie Hunt
 Dale Hunter
 Dave Hunter
 Mark Hunter
 Tim Hunter
 Trent Hunter
 Matt Hunwick
 Larry Huras
 Bob Hurlburt
 Mike Hurlbut
 Paul Hurley
 Jani Hurme
 Ron Hurst
 Jamie Huscroft
 Kristian Huselius
 Ryan Huska 
 Kent Huskins
 Matt Hussey
 Ville Husso
 Ron Huston
 Andrew Hutchinson
 Michael Hutchinson 
 Ron Hutchinson
 Dave Hutchison
 Ben Hutton
 Bill Hutton
 Carter Hutton
 Tomas Hyka
 Harry Hyland
 Zach Hyman
 Dave Hynes
 Gord Hynes 
 Hannes Hyvonen

See also
 hockeydb.com NHL Player List - H

Players